Bruce Allen Harrell (born October 10, 1958) is an American politician and attorney serving as the 57th and current mayor of Seattle, Washington. He served as a member of the Seattle City Council from District 2 from 2016 to 2020. Elected to the council in 2007 and reelected in 2011 and 2015, he did not run in 2019. In 2016, he was chosen as president of the city council. He also served as acting mayor of Seattle from September 13 to 18, 2017. He was elected mayor in his own right in the 2021 Seattle mayoral election, winning with 59 percent of the vote, becoming the second Black mayor since Norm Rice, and the first African-Asian American mayor of the city.

Early life and education

Harrell was born in 1958 in Seattle, to an African American father who worked for Seattle City Light and a Japanese American mother who worked for the Seattle Public Library. As a child during World War II, Harrell's mother was interred with her family at Minidoka internment camp in Idaho. Growing up, Harrell and his family lived in the Central District in Seattle in a minority neighborhood. He attended Garfield High School and played football there as a linebacker, becoming named to the all-Metro team. Harrell graduated from Garfield in 1976 as class valedictorian.

After high school, Harrell attended the University of Washington on a football scholarship, rejecting an offer to attend Harvard University. He played for the Washington Huskies football team from 1976 to 1979 and was named to the 1979 All-Pacific-10 Conference football team. He also received the National Football Foundation Scholar-Athlete Award, made the national Academic All-American First Team in football, and was named the Husky defensive player of the year.

Harrell graduated from the University of Washington in 1980 with a Bachelor of Arts degree in political science. Four years later, he earned a Juris Doctor from the University of Washington School of Law. In 1994, Harrell earned a master's degree in organizational design and improvement from City University of Seattle.

In 2007, Harrell received the University of Washington Distinguished Alumni Award. In 2012, he won the University of Washington's Timeless Award, and in 2013 he was inducted into the NW Football Hall of Fame.

Legal career

After attending law school, Harrell joined US West, now Lumen Technologies, in 1987. Harrell was chief legal advisor to the Rainier Valley Community Development Fund, chief legal advisor to the First A.M.E. Church and First A.M.E. Housing Corporation, chief counsel to US West, and general counsel to Moovn and the Alpha Phi Alpha fraternity, Zeta Pi Lambda chapter.

In addition to his legislative responsibilities, Harrell chairs the Puget Sound Regional Council's Performance First Committee, a business development strategy of PSRC's Prosperity Partnership; is advisory board chair for CASASTART, a focused strategy for youth with behavioral challenges at Seattle Public Schools; and is a member of the Social Action Committee for First A.M.E. Church.

Seattle City Council

Harrell was elected to the Seattle City Council in 2007. Between 2008 and 2011, he chaired the Energy, Technology, and Civil Rights Committee and was responsible for oversight of Seattle City Light, the city's public power utility and the city's Department of Information and Technology. In 2010, he created a Rate Stabilization Account (RSA) for Seattle City Light. The account provides protection for Seattle City Light customers from the volatility of the wholesale power market.

In 2011, Harrell sponsored a program to establish partnerships with technology companies and financial institutions to provide need-based Internet access to students in the Seattle Public Schools. In 2011, he wrote a letter to now former US Attorney Jenny Durkan asking that the federal government mandate body cameras in Seattle.

In 2013, Harrell introduced legislation to regulate the Seattle Police Department's use of drones and other surveillance measures in an effort to protect the public's civil liberties. He also authored "ban the box" legislation that passed on June 10, 2013.

Following years of at-large city council elections, Harrell was reelected into the newly created District 2 position after a change to district-based city council elections. On January 4, 2016, he was sworn in to the District 2 office and elected council president by fellow councilmembers. In 2016, Harrell supported a measure to attempt to bring back the Seattle SuperSonics, but the measure was defeated in a 5–4 vote.

Acting mayor of Seattle 
Harrell was sworn in as acting mayor of Seattle on September 13, 2017, after Mayor Ed Murray resigned due to multiple allegations of child abuse, rape and sexual molestation. Harrell served as acting mayor for a five-day period, after which the city council elected Tim Burgess to fill the position until the November election. Harrell declined to continue as acting mayor until November, which would have required him to lose his city council seat.

Mayor of Seattle

After Mayor Jenny Durkan announced in 2021 that she would not seek reelection, Harrell announced his candidacy. He won the November 2021 election and was sworn in as the 57th mayor of Seattle on January 1, 2022.

Mayoral powers 
Seattle has a mayor-council government system. This means the mayor has the power to veto council legislation, appoint and remove department heads, and develop strong policy agendas. While the City Council holds legislative authority, the mayor holds executive authority.

Appointments and resignations

Chief of Seattle Police 
Harrell appointed Adrian Diaz to be chief of Seattle police in September 2022. Diaz was deputy chief of police until Chief Carmen Best resigned in August 2020 in response to the City Council’s plan to lay off 100 police officers, making Diaz interim police chief. His appointment made his role permanent after a search for the position included 15 candidates with three finalists: Diaz, Seattle Police Department Assistant Chief Eric Greening, and Tucson, Arizona, Police Assistant Chief Kevin Hall. Harrell openly campaigned for Diaz to apply for the role. The Downtown Seattle Association and Seattle Metropolitan Chamber of Commerce, which have publicly praised Harrell's public safety policies, both publicly supported Diaz's appointment. The Seattle Police Officer's Guild also supported the appointment, saying that Diaz's "internal knowledge of the department" gained him favor among their members. In a news conference following his appointment, Diaz said that his priorities as chief would be addressing violent crimes, ending the police department staff shortage, and improving department culture.

Deputy mayor 
Deputy Mayor Kendee Yamaguchi resigned in July 2022. Harrell informed his cabinet that Greg Wong would be promoted to deputy mayor. Harrell informed the press that Yamaguchi had resigned to "pursue other opportunities".

Harrell appointed Wong Deputy Mayor of External Relations in August 2022. Wong previously served as the Interim Director of the Seattle Department of Neighborhoods. Deputy Director of the Department of Neighborhoods Sarah Morningstar will serve as acting director until a permanent director is found.

Director of the Department of Neighborhoods 
In February 2022 Harrell appointed Wong Director of the Department of Neighborhoods, saying, "Greg [has] demonstrated work ethic and [a] values-driven approach, along with [a] long record of local leadership and community partnership."

Director of the Office of Economic Development 
In February 2022 Harrell announced the appointment of Markham McIntyre as director of the Office of Economic Development. Harrell said that McIntyre was appointed because he can "make the most of COVID recovery investments and work with Seattle businesses to drive real economic development that will benefit the whole community".

Director for the Office of Police Accountability 
Harrell appointed Gino Bettis as director of the Office of Police Accountability on August 1, 2022. Bettis previously served as the assistant state’s attorney in Cook County, Illinois. Harrell said he appointed Bettis because of his "commitment to fairness and justice, belief in continuous learning and improvement, and proven experience". One of Bettis's highest-profile cases as assistant state’s attorney was his investigation of former Chicago police chief Ronald Watts.

Director of Seattle Department of Transportation 
In July 2022, Harrell nominated Gregg Spotts as director of the Department of Transportation after a search process that included a search committee. Spotts previously served as the Executive Officer and Chief Sustainability Officer at the Los Angeles Bureau of Street Services, where he is credited for delivering over $600 million in American Recovery and Reinvestment Act projects, and for making Los Angeles more "walkable, bikeable, transit-friendly, and sustainable". Harrell said he nominated Spotts because he "understands local priorities and recognizes how community voices can enhance and improve our transportation system". Spotts received numerous endorsements upon his nomination, including from Councilmember Alex Pederson, Port of Seattle Commission President Ryan Calkins, a representative from the union PROTEC17, the transportation lead from the Seattle Chamber of Commerce, the Seattle Department of Transportation interim director, and the executive director of the Cascade Bike Club. He began his work as interim director on September 7, 2022; on September 13, the City Council unanimously approved him, and he officially became director. Upon his confirmation, Spotts said his priorities included reviewing the Vision Zero program and accelerating the improvement of the city's bridges.

Director of Sustainability and Environment 
In February 2022, Harrell announced the appointment of State Representative Jessyn Farrell as Director of Sustainability and Environment, taking over for Interim Director Michelle Caulfield, who returned to the Deputy Director role. Harrell said that Farrell would bring "ambitious policy ideas and experience, needed collaborative approach, and vision grounded in a true commitment to environmental justice".

Seattle Parks and Recreation Superintendent 
In September 2022, Harrell named Executive Officer and Assistant General Manager for the Los Angeles Department of Recreation and Parks Anthony-Paul (AP) Diaz as Seattle Parks and Recreation Superintendent. Harrell said he chose Diaz because he has a "track record of working collaboratively and innovatively with community and a commitment to preserving open spaces… [he understands] how parks create opportunities, advance equity, provide safe spaces, and support youth through mentorship".

Issues

Homelessness 
In May 2022, Harrell announced his "One Seattle Homelessness Action Plan" to reduce the number of homeless and displaced people in Seattle. The plan includes funding for 2,000 units of low-income housing to relocate homeless persons from encampments throughout the city.

In July 2022, the Pacific Northwest experienced a historic heat wave that brought dangerously high temperatures to Seattle. Harrell's administration faced harsh criticism for continuing to remove homeless encampments during the heat wave, a move critics say displaced homeless persons during deadly weather conditions without alternative housing available. Harrell rebutted the objections, but numerous homeless persons reported to local news outlets that the city offered no plans to relocate them to safe housing after their encampments were removed. The Harrell administration's move was opposed by numerous city council members and by the Regional Homelessness Authority.

Transportation 
Harrell's administration has emphasized the importance of increasing Seattle's public transit reliability, safety, and ease of use. Harrell is expected to announce further transportation plans in the near future. Seattle's current Transportation Millage expires in 2024, so Seattle voters must pass a new proposal to continue funding for transportation projects. Seattle has faced a rise in pedestrian accidents and deaths, leading Harrell to assemble a team committed to addressing Seattle's top transportation concerns.

In July 2022, Harrell's administration reversed a decision made by former mayor Jenny Durkan to make the Department of Transportation responsible for issuing parking violation tickets instead of the Seattle Police Department. The move resulted in the cancellation of 200,000 parking tickets that had been issued by the Department of Transportation, as department officials and legal experts questioned the legality of civilian-issued parking tickets. Seattle vowed to refund nearly $5 million to those who paid the invalid tickets.

Climate change 
During his 2021 mayoral campaign, Harrell released "The Emerald City Plan" with the goals of reducing harmful emissions, strengthening climate resilience, and centering environmental justice. The plan calls for developing a localized clean energy economy, establishing 100% clean buildings, preserving and investing in Seattle’s park system, and divesting from fossil fuels. Harrell says he believes Seattle should be a leading force for environmental change in the nation and also plans to reduce home energy consumption by phasing out natural gas usage and reverting to green electricity by installing more heat pumps. In September 2022, Harrell signed Green New Deal legislation in Seattle allocating $6.5 million for climate projects in the city, including funding towards efforts to get city-owned buildings off fossil fuels by 2035.

Public safety and police reform 
From 2021 to 2022, the number of violent and property crimes decreased from 5,412 to 4,856 and from 42,538 to 37,240, respectively. Homicide was the only category in violent or property crimes that increased, from 42 to 46.

Harrell plans to ensure public safety by investing in prevention and intervention programs to reduce gun violence, assist victims of crime, and mentor at-risk youth. He also hopes to create a budget that guarantees proper training and needed staff.

Harrell is also working with Police Chief Adrian Diaz to address high-crime neighborhoods using hot-spot policing. Hot-spot policing strategies focus resources on small geographic areas where crime is highly concentrated. Harrell and Diaz are also using various recruitment strategies to increase employment. Their approach to public safety has been praised by the Downtown Seattle Association and the Seattle Metropolitan Chamber of Commerce.

Reducing gun violence 
Harrell has proposed several prevention efforts to reduce gun violence, including improving education and outreach, fighting for stronger gun laws, and investing in technology to track gunshots. Education and outreach include making sure residents understand how to properly store firearms. Stronger gun laws mean limiting the number of weapons that can enter the city. Lastly, technology such as Automatic Gunfire Locator Systems can hold offenders accountable.

2023-2024 budget

Proposed budget 
In September 2022, Harrell proposed a $7.4 billion budget for the 2023-24 fiscal year. This would be a $300 million increase from the previous fiscal year. This budget is the first biennial budget since the beginning of the COVID-19 pandemic.

Harrell's $7.4 billion budget proposal included 49% for "Utilities, Transportation, & Environment”, 21% for "Administration", 11% for "Public Safety", 7% for "Arts, Culture, and Recreation", 6% for "Liveable and Inclusive Communities", and 6% for "Education and Human Services". Utilities, Transportation & Environment is decreased by 1% of the overall budget but increased by $143 million from the previous budget. Administration stays at 21% of the overall budget but increases by $7 million from the previous fiscal year. Public Safety stays at 11% of the overall budget but increases by $13 million. Arts, Recreation, and Culture increases by 1% of the overall budget and 62 million. Liveable and Inclusive Communities stays at 6% of the overall budget but increases by $52 million. Education and Human Services stays at 6% of the overall budget and increases by $24 million.

Some of Harrell's noted allocations include over $250 million for affordable housing, shelter units, and a 13% increased investment in the King County Regional Homelessness authority; over $33 million toward the City’s Unified Care Team, Green New Deal investments, and the One Seattle Climate Justice Agenda; $8 million to fund Vision Zero projects, projects that renovate or upgrade critical transportation corridors; moving park enforcement officers back to the Seattle Police Department, a move he claims would save $5 million in overhead; a large increase in funding to law enforcement, in part to bolster officer recruitment and retention; and increased funding for the Seattle Fire Department in an effort to increase recruitment by 50% by 2023.

City Council Vote 
The Seattle City Council approved Harrell's proposed budget on November 30 by a vote of 6-3, with councilmembers Sara Nelson, Alex Pedersen, and Kshama Sawant voting against. After multiple rounds of amendments and discussions the Council funded 99% of Harrell's proposals. The council did limit some of Harrell's proposed increases in funding for public safety and law enforcement, including lowering the increased funding towards the Seattle Police Department, eliminating some unfunded Seattle Police Department positions, and rejecting a proposed gunshot detection software. Despite those changes the approved budget still represented an overall increase in public safety funding.

During the voting process for the budget, the divisions between councilmembers "ruffled some feathers", according to the Seattle Times. Nelson and Pedersen voted against the budget in part due to their belief that eliminating some of the unfunded Seattle Police Department positions would hurt public safety, that the public would view this move negatively in the context of the "Defund the Police" movement prominent in 2020, and that it would impair recruitment and retention of new officers. Councilmember Lisa Herbold, one of the yes votes, countered those claims, saying that the council had fully funded the police department for three years in a row. Sawant, the lone socialist on the council, has voted no on every proposed budget since 2014, with her reason voting against the 2023-24 budget being that working people would be hurt by it while larger companies like Amazon are left unaffected. Harrell credited his budget being passed, in part, due to the joint work between his office and Budget Committee Chair Teresa Mosqueda.

Budget shortfall 
The budget is able to work through the $140 million shortfall due to the use of a program called the Jumpstart payroll tax. This program grants flexible revenue that is projected to run out by 2025, representing a short-term solution to the shortfall. An amendment by Sawant to raise $140.5 million in revenue by increasing the tax rate by 47% to some of the city’s highest employers failed, gaining the support only of Councilmember Tammy Morales and Budget Committee Chair Member Mosqueda. Mosqueda, in partnership with Harrell, formed the Revenue Stabilization Work Group in an effort to find future stable revenue streams. The group and Mosqueda have not yet shared any specific proposals to raise revenue. Nelson said she had concerns about the work group, believing that the city should "spend within its means" instead of looking for additional revenue. She did not name what areas she wanted the city to cut. In the 2023-24 budget all city councilmembers proposed additional funding in their policy areas. The deficit is in part due to national inflation and in part due to various decreases in revenue; a $9.4 million decrease in the General Fund, $4.5 million decrease in the Sweetened Beverages Tax and a $64 million decrease in real estate excise taxes. It is projected to grow from $140 million in 2023 to $152 million in 2024.

Controversies

China Harbor restaurant event and subsequent Queen Anne mayoral forum 
On October 8, 2021, Harrell, at the time campaigning for mayor, attended a dinner event at China Harbor restaurant, a popular location for political fundraisers, to spread and deliver his mayoral platform. In attendance were political figures including former Washington Governor Gary Locke, Burien Mayor Jimmy Matta, and candidate for Port of Seattle Commission Hamdi Mohamad. The event, which had around 270 attendees, had many COVID-19 restrictions in place by the restaurant, including requiring proof of COVID-19 vaccination or a negative COVID-19 test, and for eventgoers to wear a mask when not eating, drinking or sitting at their table. According to state law at the time, masks were required in all public, indoor spaces, with the exception of those actively eating or drinking. During the event, Harrell and other attendees were photographed mingling and posing for photos without masks. This drew criticism, including from Seattle journalist Erica Barnett, who shared the photos on Twitter and called the event a "giant, unmasked fundraiser". One of Harrell’s mayoral opponents, M. Lorena Gonzalez, later said in a forum that "leadership in my mind means that you cannot play by your own rules when it comes to public health, especially when the city is in a public health crisis". In a statement two days later, Harrell said, "even though I only removed my mask for dining and brief intervals for photographs with friends and community leaders, I understand that people in public life will and should be held to high standards". Locke, Matta, and Mohamad all commented on the story as well: Locke said he tried to wear his mask the whole time but nobody is perfect, Matta that the venue was big enough for everyone to be safe but they were still cautious, and Mohamad that he only removed his mask to eat and some photos.

Barnett, who publicly criticized the event, was also set to be moderator for a forum hosted by the Queen Anne Community Council between Harrell and other mayoral candidates. According to Barnett, Harrell’s campaign threatened to withdraw from the forum unless she was removed as a moderator, which she eventually was. This drew a round of criticism, with Gonzalez saying at that forum, "It’s my understanding this journalist was one of the first to report on my opponent’s decision to host a very large maskless indoor fundraiser in violation of King County’s public health mandate". Harrell responded that he "had no discussions with Barnett but the question was posed, why was she the person to host us."

Leaked excerpts from homelessness meeting with Seattle Police Department 
In August 2022, as Harrell was implementing and pushing his "One Seattle'' plan to fight homelessness, excerpts from a meeting with the Seattle Police Department were leaked to the radio station 770 KTTH. In the leaks, he said that "no one has a right to sleep on the streets" and that the "authority" was "working against" his efforts to address homelessness, criticized the King County Regional Homelessness Authority, and vowed to work against "inexperienced" City Council members. In later comments he acknowledged his statements, and did not disavow them, but used more "diplomatic" language, according to the Seattle Times. In those comments he also said he had a right to "criticize what he sees" but that he would call anyone who might be offended by his leaked remarks. Lisa Daugaard, the director of the Public Defender Association and overseer of the Law Enforcement Assisted Diversion, a program to provide care for those who break the law due to extreme poverty, said that its relationship with Harrell was still "in good shape". King County Regional Homelessness Authority CEO Mark Dones did not directly address Harrell's remarks but stated his belief in the Homelessness Authority's work. First-term City Councilmember Andrew Lewis noted that he did not believe the comments meant there would be any substantive changes with the mayor and the council, and that he had no concerns over the remarks.

Personal life 
Harrell and his wife Joanne married in 1992; they have three children and live in Seattle's Seward Park neighborhood.

Electoral history

2007 election

2011 election

2013 mayoral election

2015 election

2021 mayoral election

See also
 Washington Huskies football statistical leaders

References

External links

|-

 

1958 births
20th-century African-American people
21st-century African-American politicians
21st-century American politicians
African-American mayors in Washington (state)
African-American people in Washington (state) politics
American mayors of Japanese descent
American politicians of Japanese descent
Asian-American city council members
Asian-American people in Washington (state) politics
Living people
Mayors of Seattle
Seattle City Council members
Garfield High School (Seattle) alumni
University of Washington College of Arts and Sciences alumni
Washington Huskies football players
Washington (state) Democrats